Maria Averina  (born ) is a Russian female track cyclist, representing Russia at international competitions. She won the bronze medal at the 2016–17 UCI Track Cycling World Cup, Round 1 in Glasgow in the madison.

Career results
2015
Grand Prix of Tula
1st Points Race
1st Scratch Race
2nd Scratch Race, Grand Prix Minsk
2017
Grand Prix Minsk
1st Madison (with Galina Streltsova)
3rd Scratch Race
1st Madison, Grand Prix of Moscow (with Galina Streltsova)
Grand Prix of Tula
2nd Points Race
2nd Scratch Race

References

1993 births
Living people
Russian female cyclists
Russian track cyclists
Place of birth missing (living people)